The Bad Homburg Open is a women's professional tennis tournament held on outdoor grass courts at the Bad Homburg Tennis Club in Bad Homburg, Germany. Classified as a WTA 250 tournament on the WTA Tour, the event held its inaugural edition in June 2021 after it was initially postponed from 2020 due to the COVID-19 pandemic.

In September 2019, the All England Lawn Tennis and Croquet Club (AELTC) announced that they would invest in new grass tennis tournaments to be scheduled before the Wimbledon Championships on the ATP Tour and WTA Tour. Among the new investments included a WTA event planned for Bad Homburg with the collaboration of German sports agency Perfect Match as well as German tennis player Angelique Kerber and her management team, after which she would become the tournament ambassador. The new stadium at the Bad Homburg Tennis Club was built on the site of the first tennis court in Europe, Kurpark, and in July 2020, Kerber christened the stadium at its opening ceremony.

Past finals

Singles

Doubles

References

External links
 Bad Homburg Open—official website

WTA Tour
Grass court tennis tournaments
Tennis tournaments in Germany
Sport in Hesse
Recurring sporting events established in 2020
2020 establishments in Germany
Bad Homburg vor der Höhe